The Japanese destroyer  was one of twelve s, built for the Imperial Japanese Navy (IJN) during the 1920s. During the Pacific War, she participated in the Battle of Wake Island in December 1941 and the occupations of New Guinea and the Solomon Islands in early 1942.

Design and description
The Mutsuki class was an improved version of the s and was the first with triple  torpedo tubes. They were powered by two Parsons geared steam turbines, each driving one propeller shaft, using steam provided by four Kampon water-tube boilers. Their crew consisted of 150 officers and crewmen.

The main armament of the Mutsuki-class ships consisted of four  Type 3 guns in single mounts; one gun forward of the superstructure, one between the two funnels and the last pair back to back atop the aft superstructure. The guns were numbered '1' to '4' from front to rear. The ships carried two above-water triple sets of 61-centimeter torpedo tubes; one mount was between the forward superstructure and the forward gun and the other was between the aft funnel and aft superstructure. Four reload torpedoes were provided for the tubes. They carried 18 depth charges and could also carry 16 mines. They could also fitted with minesweeping gear.

Construction and career
Mochizuki, built by the Uraga Dock Company at their shipyard in Uraga, was laid down on 23 March 1926, launched on 28 April 1927 and completed on 31 October 1927. Originally commissioned simply as Destroyer No. 33, the ship was assigned the name Mochizuki on 1 August 1928. In the late 1930s, the ship participated in combat in the Second Sino-Japanese War, covering the landings of Japanese troops in central and southern China.

Pacific War
At the time of the attack on Pearl Harbor on 7 December 1941, Mochizuki was assigned to Destroyer Division 30 under Destroyer Squadron 6 of the 4th Fleet. She sortied from Kwajalein on 8 December as part of the Wake Island invasion force.

After taking heavy losses (including Kisaragi and Hayate), the Japanese force withdrew before landing.  This was the first Japanese defeat of the war, and also the only occasion in World War II when an amphibious assault was repulsed by shore-based guns. Mochizuki returned on December 23 with the second Wake Island invasion force before sailing back to Kwajalein.

The ship escorted a convoy from Kwajalein to the naval base at Truk in January 1942, where a sponson was installed for a pair of license-built  Type 93 anti-aircraft machineguns on the forward side of the bridge, and then to Guam. From February through March, she participated in the invasion of the Solomon Islands, covering the landings of Japanese forces during Operation R (the invasion of Rabaul, New Ireland and New Britain), and during Operation SR (the invasion of Lae and Salamaua on New Guinea), and in April, covering landings on the Admiralty Islands. During the Battle of the Coral Sea from 7–8 May 1942, Mochizuki was assigned to the Operation Mo invasion force for Port Moresby. After that operation was cancelled, it returned to Truk, escorting airfield construction convoys between Truk, Lae and Guadalcanal until recalled to Japan in mid-July for refitting.

After repairs were completed at Sasebo Naval Arsenal, Mochizuki was reassigned to the IJN 8th Fleet. At the end of September, Mochizuki sortied with the destroyer  to rescue survivors from the destroyer  on Normanby Island. On 14–15 October Mochizuki provided cover for the cruisers  and  during a bombardment of Henderson Field. Throughout November, Mochizuki made numerous “Tokyo Express” troop transport runs to Guadalcanal. On one of these runs (8 November), she was hit by a dud torpedo from PT-61. On another run (13–15 November), she assisted  in rescuing 1500 survivors from the torpedoed Nagara Maru and Canberra Maru transports.

On 1 December 1942, Mochizuki was reassigned to the IJN 8th Fleet. Mochizuki came under air attack on several occasions, suffering minor damage

After making two Tokyo Express runs from Rabaul to Kolombangara and Rekata Bay in January 1943, Mochizuki returned to Sasebo for repairs. She returned to Rabaul at the end of March, assisting the torpedoed Florida Maru along the way. Through the end of June 1943, Mochizuki was used as a Tokyo Express transport to Rekata, Buna, Tuluvu and Kolombangara. The damage was severe enough to warrant a return to Sasebo to the end of August. After returning to Rabaul at the end of September, Mochizuki resumed Tokyo Express operations

Most of the crew were rescued by her sister ship . The ship was struck from the Navy List on 5 January 1944.

Notes

References

 

 

 

Mutsuki-class destroyers
Ships built by Uraga Dock Company
1927 ships
Second Sino-Japanese War naval ships of Japan
World War II destroyers of Japan
Destroyers sunk by aircraft
World War II shipwrecks in the Pacific Ocean
Shipwrecks in the Solomon Sea
Maritime incidents in October 1943
Ships sunk by US aircraft